Structural maintenance of chromosomes protein 6 is a protein that in humans is encoded by the SMC6 gene.

Structure 
The SMC6 was discovered first in fission yeast as RAD18 (SMC6). It forms a heterodimeric complex with Spr18 (SMC5) protein. In yeast, SMC5/6 complex has sub-units which consists of SMC5, SMC6 and six nonstructural maintenance of chromosomes (NSE) proteins. Nse1-Nse3-Nse4 subunits bridge the Smc5 head Smc6 and allow the binding of DNA. 

It is involved in the Alternative lengthening of telomeres cancer mechanism.

Role in recombination and meiosis
Smc6 and Smc5 proteins form a heterodimeric ring-like structure and together with other non-SMC elements form the SMC-5/6 complex.  In the worm Caenorhabditis elegans this complex interacts with the HIM-6(BLM) helicase to promote meiotic recombination intermediate processing and chromosome maturation.  The SMC-5/6 complex in mouse oocytes is essential for the formation of segregation competent bivalents during meiosis.  In the yeast Saccharomyces cerevisiae, SMC6 is necessary for resistance to DNA damage as well as for damage-induced interchromosomal and sister chromatid recombination.  In humans, a chromosome breakage syndrome characterized by severe lung disease in early childhood is associated with a mutation in a component of the SMC-5/6 complex.  Patient’s cells display chromosome rearrangements, micronuclei, sensitivity to DNA damage and defective homologous recombination.

References

Further reading